OJD ("Circulation Audit Office"), formerly , is a French nonprofit organisation (in French: Association loi de 1901) that certifies the circulation of newspapers and periodicals in France, to provide advertisers with audience measurement figures.

History 

In 1963, Buisson founded, at Stockholm, the Fédération Internationale, a federation of the OJD and IFABC, and became its honorary president.

In 2005, Diffusion Contrôle was renamed OJD, its trading name since 1946.

References

External links 
  Official website

Newspapers published in France
1922 establishments in France
Market research companies of France  
Newspapers circulation audit